Mölndal Municipality (Mölndals kommun or Mölndals stad) is a municipality in Västra Götaland in western Sweden, just south of Gothenburg. Its seat is located in Mölndal, which lies within the Gothenburg urban area, and the whole municipality is part of Metropolitan Gothenburg.

In 1911 a municipalsamhälle (a kind of borough within a rural municipality, handling matters of urban character) named Mölndal was instituted in the municipality of Fässberg. In 1922 Fässberg was made the City of Mölndal. In 1971 it was amalgamated with Kållered and Lindome (the latter transferred from Halland County). At the same time it became a municipality of unitary type, like all others in the country. The municipality prefers, however, to style itself Mölndals stad (City of Mölndal) as a semi-official name whenever legally possible. This usage has no effect on the status of the municipality.

Demographics
The municipality has four main parts: Mölndal, Kållered, Lindome and Hällesåker.

Mölndal has 37,131 inhabitants (a part of the contiguous Gothenburg urban area)
Kållered has 7,257 inhabitants
Lindome has 13,364 inhabitants
Hällesåker has 900 inhabitants

Numbers from 2003.

Sights of interest 
 Gunnebo House from the 18th century.
 Fässberg Church from the 19th century

Notable residents
 Lars Leksell (1907–1986), physician and neurosurgeon

Sister cities
As of November 2021, Mölndal has no twin cities.

See also
Eklanda
Forsåker

References

External links

Mölndal Municipality – Official site
 Article Mölndal – From Nordisk Familjebok

Municipalities of Västra Götaland County
Metropolitan Gothenburg
Gothenburg and Bohus
1922 establishments in Sweden